or  is a technique used in Indonesian Javanese gamelan. It refers to a rapid alternation of a melodic line between instruments, in a way similar to hocket in medieval music or kotekan in Balinese gamelan. "A style of playing in which two identical or similar instruments play interlocking parts forming a single repetitive melodic pattern."

In Javanese gamelan, it is used especially for the sarons and the bonangs. On the bonangs, an imbal pattern is divided between the bonang panerus and bonang barung, in the octave or so of range that both instruments have. When played on sarons, generally two of the same instrument are used. Both bonang and saron patterns generally are made of scalar passages that end on the seleh at the end of the gatra. Each key is dampened as soon as the other instrument plays, and it allows the melody to be played faster or more smoothly than is possible by a single performer. "Basically, there are two bonang-playing techniques: imbal-imbalan and pipilan. Imbal-imbalan (interlocking) refers to the playing technique in which bonang barung and bonang panerus play interlocking patterns."

On the bonangs, an imbal passage is usually followed by a sekaran.

See also

 Gamelan
 Panerusan
 kotekan
 Gatra
 Gendhing structures
 Music of Indonesia
 Music of Java

References

Gamelan theory
Musical techniques